Rodolfo Pinto do Couto (Porto, Portugal, 1888–Portugal, 1945) was a Portuguese sculptor active in Portugal and Brazil.

Works

Among the best and most well-known works of Rodolfo Pinto do Couto include the following:
bronze pulpits ( 1931 ) of the Church of the Candelaria in Rio de Janeiro
Bust of Portuguese writer Fialho de Almeida, patinated bronze - 1928

1888 births
1945 deaths
Portuguese sculptors
Male sculptors
People from Porto
20th-century sculptors
Portuguese expatriates in Brazil